In algebra, a linear topology on a left -module  is a topology on  that is invariant under translations and admits a fundamental system of neighborhood of  that consists of submodules of  If there is such a topology,  is said to be linearly topologized. If  is given a discrete topology, then  becomes a topological -module with respect to a linear topology.

See also

References

 Bourbaki, N. (1972). Commutative algebra (Vol. 8). Hermann.

Topology
Topological algebra
Topological groups